Joshua Jacobs (born February 15, 1996) is an American professional ice hockey defenseman who is currently playing for the Colorado Eagles in the American Hockey League (AHL) while under contract to the Colorado Avalanche of the National Hockey League (NHL). He was selected by the New Jersey Devils, 41st overall, in the 2014 NHL Entry Draft.

Playing career
As a Michigan native, Jacobs originally played in the Detroit Honeybaked U16 program in the Tier 1 Elite Hockey League before he was selected in the 2012 Ontario Hockey League Priority Selection, 72nd overall, by the Sarnia Sting.

Jacobs opted to continue his development in the United States Hockey League, joining the Indiana Ice in the 2012–13 season and later committing to play collegiate hockey with Michigan State University of the Big Ten Conference. In his second season with Indiana, Jacobs helped contribute with 23 points in 56 games to claim the Clark Cup. Jacobs was drafted by the Devils in the second round, 41st overall, of the 2014 NHL Entry Draft.

In his freshman season with the Spartans in 2014–15, Jacobs registering 9 assists in 35 games from the blueline, earning a selection to the Conference All-Rookie Team. Jacobs opted to conclude his collegiate tenure after his freshman season, choosing to continue his development through major junior hockey in signing with the Sarnia Sting of the OHL on June 1, 2015.

In his solitary 2015–16 season in the OHL, Jacobs scored 4 goals and 24 points in 67 games. Jacobs added 5 assists in the Sting’s seven-game series defeat against Sault Ste. Marie Greyhounds. Upon the Stings elimination, Jacobs signed a three-year, entry-level contract with the New Jersey Devils on April 9, 2016. He immediately joined the Devils AHL affiliate, the Albany Devils, on an amateur try-out basis for the remainder of the season, making his professional debut to close out the regular season.

During the final year of his entry-level contract, while in his second season with the Binghamton Devils in the 2018–19 campaign, Jacobs received his first recall to the NHL by the injury-hit Devils on March 21, 2019. He made his NHL debut with the Devils on the same day in a 5-1 defeat to the Boston Bruins at the Prudential Center in Newark, New Jersey. He was then returned to the AHL with Binghamton following the game.

As a free agent from the Devils after 6 seasons within the organization, Jacobs was signed to a one-year, two-way contract with the Carolina Hurricanes on August 4, 2021. After attending the Hurricanes training camp, Jacobs was assigned to AHL affiliate, the Chicago Wolves, for the duration of the 2021–22 season. In a regular defensive role on the blueline, Jacobs recorded 4 goals and 15 points through 51 regular season games. In the post-season, Jacobs posted career highs with 2 points through 18 games to help the Wolves capture the Calder Cup.

Jacobs left the Hurricanes organization as a free agent and was signed to a one-year, two-way contract with the Colorado Avalanche on July 13, 2022.

Career statistics

Awards and honors

References

External links

1996 births
Living people
Adirondack Thunder players
Albany Devils players
Binghamton Devils players
Chicago Wolves players
Colorado Eagles players
Indiana Ice players
Michigan State Spartans men's ice hockey players
People from Oceana County, Michigan
New Jersey Devils draft picks
New Jersey Devils players
Sarnia Sting players
American men's ice hockey defensemen
Ice hockey players at the 2012 Winter Youth Olympics